Russia participated at the Eurovision Song Contest 2010, held in Oslo, Norway in May 2010, and was represented by broadcaster Rossiya Channel (RTR).

Before Eurovision

Evrovidenie 2010 

Evrovidenie 2010 was the sixth edition of Evrovidenie, the music competition that selects Russia's entry for the Eurovision Song Contest. The show took place on 7 March 2010 at the Vladimir Nazarov's Theater in Moscow and hosted by Oxana Fedorova and Dmitry Guberniev. Twenty-five artists and songs participated and the winner was selected through a jury and a public televote. The show was broadcast on Russia-1, RTR-Planeta as well as online via the official Eurovision Song Contest website eurovision.tv.

Competing entries 
On 9 December 2009, RTR announced a submission period for interested artists and composers to submit their entries until 15 February 2010. In addition to the public submissions, the broadcaster reserved the right to directly invite artists to compete in the national final as wildcards. The broadcaster received over 1,000 submissions at the conclusion of the deadline, one of them being from Eurovision Song Contest 2008 winner Dima Bilan who submitted the song "White Nights", composed by 1995 Russian Eurovision entrant Philipp Kirkorov. 35 entries were selected from the received submissions to proceed to auditions held on 1 March 2010 at the Vladimir Nazarov's Theater in Moscow where a jury panel selected the twenty-five finalists for the national final. The competing acts were announced on 2 March 2010 and did not include Bilan. Bilan's producer Yana Rudkovskaya later stated that the absence was a mutual decision between Bilan, Kirkorov and Rudkovskaya herself.

Final 
The final took place on 7 March 2010. Twenty-five entries competed and the winner, "Lost and Forgotten" performed by Peter Nalitch Band, was determined through a 50/50 combination of votes from a jury panel and public televoting. The jury consisted of Andrey Demidov (general director of Muz-TV), Igor Krutoy (composer), Gennady Gokhshtein (executive entertainment producer of Russia-1), Maxim Fadeev (composer and producer) and Sergey Arhipov (deputy director of Radio Mayak). In addition to the performances of the competing entries, Dima Bilan and Eurovision Song Contest 2009 winner Alexander Rybak performed as guests.

At Eurovision 

Russia competed in the first semi-final of the contest, on 25 May 2010. Though it looks that the success of Russia in the Semi-Final voting caused a matter of contention as there was prominent booing during the television broadcast of the first semi final and the show itself. This booing was noted by commentators at the time of broadcast as it was hard to ignore.

In the semi-final Russia came 7th with 74 points, and thus qualified for the final. The public awarded Russia 4th place with 92 points and the jury awarded 14th place with 41 points. In the final Russia came 11th with 90 points, with the public awarding Russia 11th place with 107 points and the jury awarding 15th place with 63 points.

Voting

Points awarded to Russia

Points awarded by Russia

Notes

References 

2010
Countries in the Eurovision Song Contest 2010
Eurovision